The Communist Students League (Portuguese: União dos Estudantes Comunistas or UEC) was the student wing of the Portuguese Communist Party. UEC was founded in 1972.

On November 10, 1979 UEC merged with the Young Communist League (UJC) to form the Portuguese Communist Youth (JCP).

Student wings of political parties in Portugal
Student wings of communist parties
Portuguese Communist Party